Karnataka Folklore University, also known as Karnataka Jaanapada Vishwavidyalaya, is a public university exclusively dedicated to the study and research of folklore. It was established in 2011 at Haveri district by the Government of Karnataka. Its first vice chancellor was Ambalike Hiriyanna.

The university is claimed to be world's first university for folklore. It was inaugurated on 16 June 2012 by the then Chief Minister of Karnataka D. V. Sadananda Gowda. The university is in Gotagodi, Shiggaon, Karnataka, India. It offers degrees M.A. in various fields were well MBA, MPhil and PhD.

References

External links 
 

Universities in Karnataka
Universities and colleges in Haveri district
Karnataka folklore
2011 establishments in Karnataka
Educational institutions established in 2011
Folklore studies